Rachaya Al Foukhar (also spelled Rashaya Al Foukhar) is a Lebanese village in the district of Hasbaya in the Nabatiye Governorate in southern Lebanon. It is located on the western slopes of Mount Hermon at an altitude starting at 750 m with the highest summit being at 1,250 m. The population is Greek Orthodox.

History
In 1838, during the Ottoman era, Eli Smith noted the  population of Rachaya Al Foukhar as being  "Greek" Christians.

In 1852 Edward Robinson noted: "The village is celebrated for its pottery; for the manufacture of which it is one of the chief seats. There are many large dome-shaped furnaces for burning of ware; and many specimens were standing outside of the houses [..], tall jars, and the like.  This pottery is sent around to all the fairs of the country, and far into the Hauran; as also to Hums and Hamah."

In 1875, Victor Guérin found here a town with 700 inhabitants, mostly   "Schismatic Greek". He also noted the pottery production, and that there was a small Protestant mission in the place.

In 1990, U.S missionary William Robinson was killed here by masked gunmen.

References

Bibliography

External links
Rachaiya El Foukhar, Localiban
 
Populated places in Hasbaya District
Eastern Orthodox Christian communities in Lebanon